LSB may refer to:

Basketball Leagues
Liga Sudamericana de Básquetbol, South America's prime international basketball league
Liga Superior de Baloncesto, Cuba's top basketball league

Organisations
Legal Services Board, independent body responsible for overseeing the regulation of lawyers in England and Wales
 Lending Standards Board, promote fair lending and increase consumer protection in the UK; by proactively monitoring and enforcing the Standards of Lending Practice.
Lexington State Bank, a banking company based in Lexington, North Carolina
Local services board (Ontario), local government in the Canadian province of Ontario
Lån & Spar Bank, a banking company based in Copenhagen, Denmark

Education
Lavelle School for the Blind, school in New York City
London School Board, former local government and education
Luxembourg School of Business, a business school in Luxembourg
Lyceum of Subic Bay, a college in the Philippines

Science, medicine and technology
Lauryl tryptose broth, a biological selective medium
Lower sideband, a band of frequencies in radio communications
Long spine board, a device for casualty lifting and spine trauma prehospital care
Low-surface-brightness galaxy, in astronomy
Lysergic acid 2-butyl amide, a psychoactive compound related to LSD

Computing
 Least significant bit, the bit with the lowest significance in a word
 Least significant byte, the lowest byte in a multi-byte number
 Linux Standard Base, a standardisation project for Linux distributions

Other
Lenguaje de Señas Bolivianas, Bolivian Sign Language
Lutheran Service Book, hymnal for the Lutheran Church
Legacy Standard Bible, revision of the NASB 1995 that uses Yahweh instead of LORD